Podragu River may refer to:

 Podragu, a tributary of the Arpaș in Brașov County
 Podragul, a tributary of the Lotrioara in Sibiu County